Gabriela Signori (born 1960) is a Swiss historian of the Middle Ages.  She served as a professor of medieval history at the University of Münster from 2001–2006, and is a professor at the University of Konstanz from 2006 to the present.  Her main area of research in medieval studies is the social history of the era: medieval law, gender mores, piety, and religious beliefs.

Biography
As a student, Gabriela Signori studied at the University of Basel, the University of Geneva, the University of Lausanne, and the University of Paris (Sorbonne).  Her PhD advisor at Basel was the historian František Graus.  Her focus was on the late medieval period of the 14th and 15th centuries. 

She worked as a lecturer at the University of Bielefeld from 1992–2000.  She was appointed as a professor of medieval history at the University of Münster, and worked there in 2001–2006.  She then joined the University of Konstanz to continue her research and teaching.

Signori has both authored and edited several works on the history of the period, particularly its religious history and practices.

References

External links
 
 

1960 births
Living people
University of Basel alumni
University of Geneva alumni
Academic staff of the University of Münster
Academic staff of the University of Konstanz
Swiss medievalists
Women medievalists